Nationality words link to articles with information on the nation's poetry or literature (for instance, Irish or France).

Events
 With the encouragement of Sir Walter Ralegh, Edmund Spenser joins him on a trip to London, where Ralegh presented the celebrated poet to Queen Elizabeth I.

Works
 George Peele, Polyhymnia
 Edmund Spenser, The Faerie Queene, Books 1-3, in honour of Queen Elizabeth I
 Sir Philip Sidney, The Countesse of Pembrokes Arcadia, Books 1–3 (see also expanded editions of 1593, 1598, 1621, etc.)

Births
Death years link to the corresponding "[year] in poetry" article:
 March 18 – Manuel de Faria e Sousa (died 1649), Portuguese historian and poet
 June 24 – Samuel Ampzing (died 1632), Dutch clergyman and poet
 September 12 – María de Zayas (died 1661), Spanish poet and playwright
 Also:
 Baltasar del Alcazar born (died 1606), Spanish
 William Browne (died 1645), English
 Shen Yixiu (died 1635), Chinese poet and mother of female poets Ye Xiaoluan, Ye Wanwan and Ye Xiaowan
Faqi Tayran, also spelled "Feqiyê Teyran", pen name of Mir Mihemed (died 1660), Kurdish
 Hu Wenru (flourished about this year), Chinese official courtesan known for her poetry painting and playing the qin
 Théophile de Viau (died 1626), French poet and playwright
 Xu Yuan (poet) (flourished about this year), Chinese woman poet nicknamed "Xie reincarnate" in reference to Xie Daoyun

Deaths
Birth years link to the corresponding "[year] in poetry" article:
 March – Petru Cercel (born unknown), Wallachian prince and poet
 August 28 – Guillaume de Salluste Du Bartas (born 1544), French writer and poet
 November 29 – Philipp Nicodemus Frischlin (born 1547), German  philologist, poet, playwright, mathematician and astronomer
 September 20 – Robert Garnier (born 1544), French poet and playwright
 Also:
 George Puttenham (born 1529), English writer and critic
 Étienne Tabourot (born 1549), French

See also

 Poetry
 16th century in poetry
 16th century in literature
 Dutch Renaissance and Golden Age literature
 Elizabethan literature
 English Madrigal School
 French Renaissance literature
 Renaissance literature
 Spanish Renaissance literature
 University Wits

Notes

16th-century poetry
Poetry